Terry Cisco is an electrical engineer from CAED Co. in Glendale, California. Cisco was named a Fellow of the Institute of Electrical and Electronics Engineers (IEEE) in 2016 for his work in the development of airborne active array transmit and receive module technologies.

References 

Fellow Members of the IEEE
Living people
Year of birth missing (living people)
Place of birth missing (living people)
American electrical engineers